Ashurst is a surname. Notable people with the name include:

Andy Ashurst (born 1965), British pole vaulter
Bill Ashurst (born 1948), English rugby league footballer
Bill Ashurst (footballer) (1894–1947), English footballer
Eli Ashurst (1901–1927), English footballer
Henry Ashurst (merchant) (c. 1614–1680), English merchant
Henry Ashurst (town clerk) (1669–1705), Town Clerk of London 
Henry F. Ashurst (1874–1962), U.S. Senator from Arizona (1912–1941)
 Sir Henry Ashurst, 2nd Baronet (c. 1670–1732), English Member of Parliament for Windsor, 1715–1722
Jack Ashurst (born 1954), Scottish footballer
James Ashurst (died 1679), English divine 
Len Ashurst (1939–2021), English footballer and manager
Mark Ashurst-McGee (born 1969), Mormon historian
Matty Ashurst (born 1989), English rugby league footballer 
Nigel Ashurst, New Zealand association football player
William Ashhurst (1647–1720), English politician and banker
William Ashurst (footballer) (1894–1947), English footballer
William Ashurst (Lord Mayor of London) (1647–1720), English banker, Sheriff of London, Lord Mayor of London and Member of Parliament
William Ashurst (Roundhead) (1607–1656), English politician
William Henry Ashurst (judge) (1725–1807), English judge
William Henry Ashurst (solicitor) (1792–1855), English solicitor
William W. Ashurst (1893–1952), American brigadier general